Na-Young Jeon is a Dutch-South Korean actress and singer, best known for her musical theatre work.

Background
Born and raised in The Netherlands, she studied piano from the age of four and was involved in many productions of AlbA Theaterhuis in her hometown The Hague.

During her training at the Musical Theater Academy, Codarts in Rotterdam she has played leading roles in musical productions of Stage Entertainment. Credits include Kelsi in High School Musical (for which she got nominated for a John Kraaijkamp Musical Award in the category ‘Upcoming talent’ and Kim in Miss Saigon (the revival).

As Kim she appeared in the Musical Awards Gala TV Show performing ‘Sun and Moon’ live on Dutch Television. Also her performance of ‘Last night of the world’ during the annual Uitmarkt in Amsterdam was shown live on Dutch Television.

In June 2014 she finished portraying the role of Fantine in Les Misérables at the Queen’s Theatre, West End. For this portrayal she got nominated for a Broadwayworld UK/West End award in the category Best performance in a long-running West End show. She also reprised the role of Fantine in the revival of Les Misérables in Korea.

In July 2017, she played the leading role of Meng Jiang Nü (孟姜女in the new musical "The Great Wall: One Woman's Journey" in Singapore. It was directed by Darren Yap and composed by David Shrubsole. In 2018, she played Tuptim in The King and I in the West End.

Her notable screen credits include Pong in the series Conny & Clyde (VTM, Antwerp), and the title role in Akiko (Nps Kort!, nominated Gouden Kalf, best short film).

She currently commutes among Amsterdam, London, and Seoul.

Filmography

Stage

References

External links

1989 births
Living people
Actresses from The Hague
Musicians from The Hague
Dutch film actresses
Dutch musical theatre actresses
Dutch television actresses
21st-century Dutch actresses
21st-century Dutch women singers
21st-century Dutch singers
South Korean film actresses
South Korean musical theatre actresses
South Korean television actresses
21st-century South Korean actresses
21st-century South Korean women singers
Dutch people of South Korean descent